Obid is a village and municipality in the Nové Zámky District in the Nitra Region of south-west Slovakia.

History
In historical records the village was first mentioned in 1237.

Geography
The municipality lies at an altitude of 116 metres and covers an area of 24.095 km². It has a population of about 1150 people.

Ethnicity
The population is about 89% Hungarian and 11% Slovak.

Facilities
The village has a small public library and a football pitch.

External links
 https://web.archive.org/web/20080111223415/http://www.statistics.sk/mosmis/eng/run.html 
 Obid – Nové Zámky Okolie

Villages and municipalities in Nové Zámky District